Zdrój (meaning "spring, spa" in Polish) may refer to the following places:
Zdrój, Greater Poland Voivodeship (west-central Poland)
Zdrój, Warmian-Masurian Voivodeship (north Poland)

See also